DO-219 is a communications standard published by RTCA, Incorporated. It contains Minimum Operational Performance Standards (MOPS) for aircraft equipment required for Air Traffic Control (ATC) Two-Way Data Link Communications (TWDL) services.  TWDL Services are one element of Air Traffic Services Communication (ATSC).  ATSC addressing requirements are supported by the Context Management (CM) Service.  The Aeronautical Telecommunications Network (ATN) provides the media and protocols to conduct data link Air Traffic Services Communication.

Outline of Contents
Purpose and Scope
Performance requirements and Test Procedures
Installed Equipment Performance
Operational Characteristics
Appendix A: ATC Two-Way Data Link Communications Message Set
Appendix B: ATC Two-Way Data Link Communications Data Structures Glossary
Appendix C: An Overview of the Packed encoding Rules ISO PDIS 8825-2; PER Unaligned
Appendix D: A Guide for Encoding and Decoding the RTCA SC-169 Message Set for ATC 2-Way Data Link, According to the Packed Encoding Rules
Appendix E: ATC Two-Way Data Link Communications Sample Messages
Appendix F: State Table

See also
Air traffic control
Aeronautical Telecommunications Network
ACARS

RTCA standards
Avionics